Frances Ramsay Simpson (ca 1812 – March 21, 1853) was an English diarist.

The daughter of Geddes Mackenzie Simpson, a London merchant, and Frances Hume Hawkins, she was born in London.

She married her cousin George Simpson of the Hudson's Bay Company in February 1830. In March of the same year, the couple set sail for North America, so he could resume his responsibilities in the administration of the North American fur trade. She travelled to York Factory and recorded the details of that voyage in her diary. The fur trading post on Rainy Lake was renamed Fort Frances in her honour. After her arrival in Rupert's Land, First Nations women married to Hudson's Bay Company officials were excluded from respectable society. Her health deteriorated during her first pregnancy in 1831 and her son died the following year. She returned to London in 1833 to recover but her health continued to decline during three subsequent pregnancies.

She visited Lachine, just upstream of Montreal, with her husband in 1838 and, in 1845, moved there permanently. There she lived with her sister Isobel and Isobel's husband Duncan Finlayson, governor of Assiniboia. Simpson had another son in June 1850 and died in Lachine three years later.

Her account of her journey from Lachine to York Factory appeared in The Beaver in 1953 and 1954.

References 

Year of birth uncertain
1853 deaths
Writers from London
Canadian women non-fiction writers
Canadian diarists
British emigrants to Canada